Red Bull Simply Cola (previously branded as Red Bull Cola) is a beverage from Red Bull GmbH, makers of the energy drink Red Bull. The cola, which contains natural flavouring and caffeine, was introduced in 2008 in several countries.

Ingredients 

Red Bull Simply Cola is flavored with plant extracts, including galangal, vanilla, mustard seed, lime, kola nut, cocoa, liquorice, cinnamon, lemon, ginger, coca leaf, orange, corn mint, pine, cardamom, mace, clove, and lemon juice concentrate. It also contains caffeine from coffee beans; at 45 milligrams per 355ml (12-ounce) can, the caffeine level is regulated by the FDA, it contains more than Coca-Cola (34 mg) or Pepsi-Cola (37.5 mg), but less than Diet Coke (47 mg) or Mountain Dew (54 mg). The cola contains significantly less caffeine than Red Bull's eponymous energy drink (80 mg per 250 mL). The drink contains sugar and caramel color and lacks the phosphoric acid and high fructose corn syrup used in some other colas.

Availability and promotions 
In 2008, the year of its release, Red Bull Simply Cola was available in Austria, Azerbaijan, Czech Republic, Croatia, Egypt, Switzerland, Netherlands, Spain, Poland, Germany, Bulgaria, Belgium, Ireland, Italy, India, Thailand, Romania, Hungary, Russia, Slovakia, New Zealand, Mexico, United Kingdom and the United States.

Red Bull Simply Cola is packaged in 250 ml (8.4 fl. oz.) and 355 ml (12 fl. oz.) cans. The larger cans are sold both individually and in 4-packs.

Red Bull discontinued distribution of Red Bull Simply Cola in the US in late July 2011 to focus on the core markets Austria and Germany.

In 2019, Red Bull released its Organics line, which includes a new version of Red Bull Simply Cola.

In June 2021, Red Bull Simply Cola made its debut in Turkey and it's been available in the Turkish market ever since.

Cocaine claim 
In May 2009, food regulators from Germany discovered trace amounts of cocaine from coca leaf extracts in Red Bull Simply Cola, Pepsi One, and Diet Coke. Red Bull GmbH responded by insisting that only de-cocainised coca leaf extracts are used in the production of Red Bull Cola. The amounts in question are minute, around 0.13 micrograms of cocaine in a can of Red Bull Cola, so about 100,000 liters of the cola would need to be consumed for the cocaine to be harmful, according to Bernhard Hoffman, a food scientist for North Rhine-Westphalia who conducted the Red Bull study. Despite this, the drink was ordered off the shelves in the German states of Hesse, North Rhine-Westphalia, Thuringia and Rhineland-Palatinate. After the German Institute for Risk Assessment declared the product safe in a study, the drink was put back on sale from 24 August 2009 onwards.

After the news of the German ban, Taiwan confiscated 18,000 cans of Red Bull Energy Drink, but acknowledged the mistake later.

See also
 List of soft drinks by country

References

External links

Products introduced in 2008
Cola brands
Red Bull
Food and drink introduced in 2008